USS Capella (AK-13) was a cargo ship in the United States Navy during World War II. She was named for Capella, the star.

Built in Pennsylvania
Capella was built in 1920 as Comerant by American International Shipbuilding Corporation, Hog Island, Pennsylvania, under a Shipping Board contract; acquired by the Navy 20 November 1921; and commissioned 8 December 1921.

Relief supplies to Japan
Capella arrived at San Diego, California, 19 March 1922 to carry cargo along the west coast until July, when she returned to the east coast for similar duty in the next 4 months. Back in California waters in November, Capella sailed to Japan in October 1923 to bring food and medical supplies, donated by American citizens, as well as water for the relief of earthquake-desolated Yokohama.

Placed in reserve
The cargo ship resumed west coast operations until February 1924 when she returned to Norfolk, Virginia. Capella was decommissioned and placed in reserve there 1 September 1924. She was recommissioned 10 November 1938, and resumed supply runs along the east and west coast in alternate periods, on occasion penetrating Alaskan waters.

Pre-WWII and WWII service
During July and August 1940 Capella assisted in the tow of the Navy's 10,700 ton New Orleans floating drydock from Balboa, Panama Canal Zone to Pearl Harbor, Hawaii. The duration of the operation was 44 days and covered 4,771 nautical miles at an average speed of 4.5 knots.

As war threatened and the United States began the buildup of Western Hemisphere bases acquired from the British, Capella was recalled to the east coast late in September 1940. The veteran cargo ship supported bases from the Panama Canal Zone to Newfoundland with cargoes brought from Atlantic ports until 1944. In June she cleared on the first of four transatlantic convoy crossings to Scotland, and North and West Africa, all so safely guarded as to be made without incident.

On 9 April 1942, Capella was hit by a friendly torpedo fired from PT-59, causing eight injuries, but no deaths.

Post WWII and decommissioning
Capella returned to Caribbean cargo duty in June 1945, and on 30 November 1945 was decommissioned at Norfolk, Virginia. She was transferred to the War Shipping Administration in July 1946.

References

 

Design 1022 ships
1921 ships
Design 1022 ships of the United States Navy
World War II auxiliary ships of the United States
Hog Islanders